Mereni may refer to several places:

In Romania
 Mereni, Constanța, a commune in Constanța County
 Mereni, Covasna, a commune in Covasna County
 Mereni, Teleorman, a commune in Teleorman County
 Mereni, a village in Conțești Commune, Dâmbovița County
 Mereni, a village in Bărăști Commune, Olt County
 Mereni, a district in the town of Salcea, Suceava County
 Mereni, a district in the town of Titu, Dâmbovița County

In Moldova
 Mereni, Anenii Noi, a commune in Anenii Noi district
 Merenii Noi, a commune in Anenii Noi district
 Mereni, a village in Albina commune, Cimișlia district